Charles "Buster" Matheney (August 2, 1956 – September 25, 2000) was an American basketball player who played four years for the University of Utah, before being drafted by the Houston Rockets in the 1978 NBA Draft. However, he did not play in the NBA. Matheney was shot and killed on a Los Angeles street in September 2000.
Also played for Newcastle Falcons in Newcastle, NSW, Australia

References

Profile —TheDraftReview.com

1956 births
2000 deaths
American expatriate basketball people in Australia
American expatriate basketball people in the Philippines
American men's basketball players
Basketball players from Los Angeles
Deaths by firearm in California
Houston Rockets draft picks
Philippine Basketball Association imports
Power forwards (basketball)
Utah Utes men's basketball players
People murdered in California
American murder victims
Male murder victims